Two warships of Japan have been named Kitakami:

 , a  launched in 1920 and scrapped in 1946
 , an  launched in 1963 and stricken in 1993

Japanese Navy ship names